Cyprinus pellegrini is a species of cyprinid fish in the genus Cyprinus that is endemic to Yunnan, China. It is found in Xingyun Lake.

See also
 List of endangered and protected species of China

References

Further reading
 

Cyprinus
Endemic fauna of China
Freshwater fish of China
Taxa named by Tchang Tchung-Lin
Fish described in 1933